James Arthur Edwards (18 April 1949 – 13 January 2015) was a lead singer and songwriter who led many bands from the 1960s until his death.  He was most well known as lead singer of 1980s new wave band Time UK with Rick Buckler of The Jam, Danny Kustow of Tom Robinson Band, Martin Gordon (bassist in Sparks, who was then replaced by Nick South of Yoko Ono Band, Sniff 'n' the Tears and Steve Marriott's All Stars) and Ray Simone. The latter was also in Edwards's late seventies punk new wave band, Masterswitch.

Early life and ancestry 
Edwards was born in 1949 in Chiswick, England, and grew up in Kensal Rise to age 11, after which the family moved to Ashford, Middlesex. His maternal grandmother was Russian and lived in Berlin in the 1920s.  Edwards' mother was born around 1912 and might, according to Edwards, have been born out of wedlock.  Edwards' father owned a pair of  blue collar companies. In the 1980s, Edwards married singer, Honey Bane.

Career 
Edwards career began in the sixties with mod bands "The Cult" (1963–64); "The Neat Change", perhaps the first Skinhead band, formed in 1966; "The Washington Flyers", "Stumpy", "Edwards & Guest"; and "English Rose", was formed with Lynton Guest of Love Affair (1968–72) whose music (the song "Yesterdays Hero") was featured in the film "Groupie girl" (also known as "I am a Groupie").  Edwards appeared in the film as the character "Bob", and was billed as "Jimmie Edwardes".  "The Neat Change" had a strong London Mod/skinhead following in the late mid/late 1960s and their one recorded song "I lied to Auntie May" was released on the Decca label, and is considered a classic of the genre. The Neat Change played at the Marque Club in London on numerous occasions, gaining as much praise as the Small Faces and The Who.

During the early 1970s, Edwards became an A+R man at Dawn records and signed the huge hit "Kung Fu Fighting" by Carl Douglas.  He also helped Ian Dury get discovered while working with Lynton Guest and Seve Holly (drummer with Paul McCartney's Wings) in both A+R and making music himself.

During the period of 1975 to 1977, he formed the band Masterswitch, which he fronted, and which subsequently signed to Epic Records.  In 1978, the band released the single "Action Replay" which suffered from poor promotion and publicity.  After a million pounds advance from Epic Records, the band were even asked to split and reform over a record company row over who owned rights to the band's name in the UK or internationally.  Edwards became disillusioned as a result and split the band in 1978.  After the dissolution of Masterswitch, Edwards recorded several solo singles (as Jimmy and the Profile), which he released through Warner Brothers and Polydor, including "Nora's Diary", which was produced by Jimmy Pursey.

In 1979 Jimmy Pursey left his band "Sham 69" briefly and Edwards was drafted in as the new singer and a single was recorded but never released as Pursey rejoined after his supergroup with Sex Pistols members  - "The Sham Pistols" fell through.

Edwards recorded unreleased demos with The Pretenders after the band expressed themselves as admirers. This led to members of The Pretenders recording as "The Profile" on Edwards solo work.  The single "Twentieth Century Time" was engineered by Pete Wilson who went on to produce The Jam and The Style Council.  Edwards recorded a version of The Jam song In the City which included a lyric change which was approved by Paul Weller. It was produced by Godley and Creme of 10CC. Despite being released on Polydor Records it failed to chart.

After the dissolution of The Jam in 1982, drummer and writer Rick Buckler contacted Edwards and formed Time UK in 1983.  From 1983 to 1985 Edwards then wrote songs for Time UK.  Time UK had a minor UK hit with "The Cabaret/Remember Days" (which sold 60,000 copies and reached number 63 in the British charts - the original version of "The Cabaret" was recorded by Edwards three years earlier and released as a single with the Profile) in 1983 after Edwards collaborated with drummer Rick Buckler of The Jam.  The band narrowly missed a "Top of the Pops" performance at the BBC due to "Gallup" investigating chart sales/Rigging and as a result it was maintained by the singer that sales were not fairly took into account - and so an appearance was denied.  The release was the first after The Jam's breakup, beating Weller and Foxton's subsequent releases.  They released another single "Playground of Privilege"/"Puppets don't Bleed" (produced by legendary producer  Tony Visconti) which was followed by "You won't stop" on Arista Records (which failed to chart).  BBC TV appearances also included Saturday Superstore.  These recordings finally saw the light of day on "One More Time" - a 2002 CD release which included "Entertain Me" and two other tracks "Sunday Mood" and "So say Hurrah" which were recorded under the moniker -"Sharp".  The Sharp sessions were recorded in 1986 on the Unicorn label - with Rick Buckler and Bruce Foxton - the only time the bassist and drummer from the Jam have been captured reunited on record since The Jam. "Entertain Me" was Sharp's only single.  All songs were written by Edwards.  Influences musically came from Bowie, The Jam, XTC, Psychedelic Furs and early Pink Floyd.

In 2011 Edwards recorded with Sham 69 once again and he performed live as a solo artist in 2014, planning to record in 2015 with Dave Davies of The Kinks.

Over a 40-year career Edwards also recorded with Godley and Creme, Flintlock, and Mean Streets. Throughout his career he came close to success but A+R difficulties, timing, luck or problems with record companies always made recognition and success elusive.
Edwards died of cancer in January 2015 following a short illness aged 65.

References

Further reading
 2010 Stewart Home interview.
 
 

1949 births
2015 deaths
English rock singers
English male singer-songwriters
English rock guitarists
English male guitarists
English new wave musicians
Mod revival musicians
Deaths from cancer in England